Shane Scott Walton (born October 9, 1979) is a former American college and professional football player who was a safety in the National Football League (NFL) for a single season in 2003.  He played college football and soccer for the University of Notre Dame, and was recognized as a unanimous All-American in football.  The St. Louis Rams selected him in the fifth round of the 2003 NFL Draft.

Early years

Walton was born in San Diego, California.  He attended The Bishop's School in La Jolla, California, and played for the school's soccer team.  His team won under-16, under-17 and under-19 national titles while playing for the La Jolla Nomads.

College career

Walton attended the University of Notre Dame, and played for the Notre Dame Fighting Irish football team from 1999 to 2002.  He originally attended Notre Dame on a soccer scholarship and was named Big East Freshman of the Year after leading the soccer team in scoring in 1998.  He walked on to the Irish football team as a sophomore, and was recognized as a unanimous first-team All-American as a senior in 2002.  Walton finished the year with 68 tackles (46 solo), seven interceptions (two returned for touchdowns) and seven pass breakups.

Professional career

Pre-draft

Life after football

Walton currently works as a behavioral analyst with F.I.T. and coaches at his alma mater, The Bishop's School.
Walton heads the Shane Walton Foundation that funds tutors for children attempting to become eligible for private schools in San Diego.
He continues playing adult soccer for the Nomads and other teams in the San Diego area.

References

External links
 Shane Walton Foundation
 Notre Dame Fighting Irish bio

1979 births
Living people
All-American college football players
American football cornerbacks
American football safeties
Indianapolis Colts players
Notre Dame Fighting Irish football players
Notre Dame Fighting Irish men's soccer players
Soccer players from San Diego
Pittsburgh Steelers players
St. Louis Rams players
Association footballers not categorized by position
Players of American football from San Diego
Association football players not categorized by nationality